2003 Mumbai bombing may refer to:

January 2003 Mumbai bombing
March 2003 Mumbai bombing
July 2003 Mumbai bombing
August 2003 Mumbai bombings